Metaxalone, sold under the brand name Skelaxin, is a muscle relaxant medication used to relax muscles and relieve pain caused by strains, sprains, and other musculoskeletal conditions. Its exact mechanism of action is not known, but it may be due to general central nervous system depression. It is a moderately strong muscle relaxant, with relatively low incidence of side effects.

Common side effects include nausea, vomiting, drowsiness, and central nervous system (CNS) side effects, such as dizziness, headache, and irritability.

The metabolism of metaxalone involves enzymes CYP1A2 and CYP2C19 in the cytochrome P450 system.  Because many medications are metabolized by enzymes in this system, precaution must be taken when administering it with other medications involving the P450 system to avoid interactions.

Because of the potential for side effects, this drug is considered a high risk in the elderly.

Pharmacokinetics
Metaxalone exhibits increased bioavailability when taken with food. Specifically, in one study, compared to fasted conditions, the presence of food at the time of drug administration increased Cmax by 77.5%, AUC0-t by 23.5%, and AUC0-∞ by 15.4%.  Metaxalone is a substrate of CYP1A2 and CYP2C19, an inhibitor of CYP1A2, CYP2B6, CYP2C9, CYP2C19, CYP2D6, CYP2E1, and CYP3A, and an inducer of CYP1A2 and CYP3A4.

Assay

A literature survey reveals very few methods are reported for the determination of metaxalone to date.  Nirogi et al. reported a liquid chromatographic method coupled to tandem mass spectrometry for the quantification of metaxalone in human plasma. A stability-indicating HPLC method was introduced by P.K. Sahu et al. Metaxalone has been used as an internal standard for few analytical methods.

References

External links 
 

Muscle relaxants
Carbamates
Oxazolidines
Pfizer brands
Phenol ethers
 Drugs with unknown mechanisms of action